El Dorado is a Mexican superhero featured in various incarnations of the Super Friends animated television series voiced by Mexican actor Fernando Escandon.

A variation of El Dorado appears in the animated series Young Justice, voiced by Freddy Rodriguez.

Fictional character biography
El Dorado was created solely for the Super Friends cartoons. He first appeared as minor character in the Super Friends animated shorts, which aired in 1981 season and later in Super Friends: The Legendary Super Powers Show as a full-time member. El Dorado spoke English with a Spanish accent, and used both English and Spanish words in full sentences.

In El Dorado's debut episode "Alien Mummy", it is revealed that he is of Mexican descent. The narrator sets the scene by describing the location as "ancient Aztec ruins in the Mexican wilderness". One of El Dorado's lines is "these are the mysterious ruins of my people".

In the Prime Earth continuity, El Dorado first appeared as part of the New 52 DC Universe in Suicide Squad Most Wanted: El Diablo and Amanda Waller #5 by Jai Nitz and Cliff Richards.

El Dorado makes an appearance in issue #1 of The Wonder Twins comic book released by DC Comics in February 2019. He is seen on the top panel of page 9 walking in the Hall of Justice.

He makes an appearance in Doomsday Clock, the follow-up series to Watchmen as a member of Mexico's super team, ¡Justicia!.

Powers and abilities
El Dorado's powers were not well-defined and were highly ambiguous. His most frequently used ability was teleportation, which he accomplished by wrapping his cape over his body and vanishing. Anyone or anything he wrapped his cape around could also be teleported with him, and there appeared to be no limit to the distance he could travel. Another of his frequently used powers was the ability to generate illusions. Defined as "holograms", these illusions were also capable of fooling other senses, as they sometimes generated noise and could be touched; he once created a sea monster which roared loudly, and on another occasion generated a pile of fake dolls a villain was forced to physically dig through.

He also exhibited some degree of mental powers, including telepathy seen in Super Friends season 6 episode where he communicates with Wonder Woman. During the series' opening theme, he is at one point shown to be hovering, suggesting flight capabilities, and he would sometimes enter from the side of the screen as if he were just landing.

He may have also possessed superhuman strength, as he once competed directly against Kalibak in physical combat and was also seen on several occasions to lift heavy objects with little effort. Knowledgeable about Pre-Columbian history (yet vague in his explanations), he assisted the Super Friends whenever they were forced to enter unfamiliar ruins or areas in Latin America. No official origin was ever given to explain El Dorado's past, nor the method through which he had acquired these powers. They may be mystical in nature and he is empowered by ancient magic and his people's warrior-spirit, possibly derived from ancestral "ancient Aztec sorcerers". Another possibility is that his powers are purely psionic, and the Aztec elements are incorporated purely for thematic purposes.

In other media

Television
A variation of El Dorado named Ed Dorado Jr. appears in Young Justice, voiced by Freddy Rodriguez. Introduced in the second season, this version is a teenage runaway who was captured and experimented on by the Reach, who activated his meta-gene and granted him the ability to teleport, before he is rescued by the Team and placed in S.T.A.R. Labs's custody along with fellow runaways Virgil Hawkins, Tye Longshadow, and Asami Koizumi. During his time with S.T.A.R. Labs, Ed Jr.'s scientist father Ed Dorado Sr. (voiced by Bruce Greenwood), whose life's work centers around Rannian Zeta Beam technology for teleportation purposes, surmises his son's powers came about "opportunistically" as a consequence of his work and Ed Jr.'s past attempts at running away to see him. Eventually, Ed Jr. and the runaways escape S.T.A.R. Labs, but are unknowingly manipulated by Lex Luthor into helping the Light until Arsenal reveals the truth to them. After helping the Team and the Justice League thwart the Reach's invasion of Earth, Ed Jr. moves back in with his father. In the third season, the Dorados have taken up work as counselors at the Metahuman Youth Center, with Ed Jr. joining the Outsiders as "El Dorado" to inspire the center's patients. Additionally, Ed Jr. has begun dating Bart Allen.

Film
 El Dorado makes a cameo appearance in Scooby-Doo! Mask of the Blue Falcon.
 El Dorado makes a cameo appearance in The Lego Batman Movie.

Toys
 El Dorado was scheduled to receive an action figure in the Super Powers Collection line, but the line was canceled before his figure could be made.
 El Dorado was released in Series 18 of Mattel's DC Universe Classics line.
 El Dorado received an 8-inch figure from the Figures Toy Company.
 El Dorado received a figure in the Justice League Anniversary Party Lego set.

References

DC Comics characters with superhuman strength
DC Comics characters who can teleport
DC Comics LGBT superheroes
DC Comics superheroes
DC Comics characters who have mental powers
DC Comics telepaths
DC Comics metahumans
Fictional illusionists
Fictional psychics
Fictional historians
LGBT characters in animated television series
Mexican superheroes
Fictional Mexican people
Fictional gay males
Super Friends characters
Television characters introduced in 1981
Young Justice
Young Justice (TV series)